The 2012 Bridgend Council election took place on 3 May 2012 to elect members of Bridgend County Borough Council in Wales. This was the same day as other 2012 United Kingdom local elections.

Result
With a 34.99% turnout of the electorate, the Labour Party won an additional 12 seats. This gave the Labour Group an overall majority, which they had not had for the previous eight years. However, Labour's council cabinet member, Alana Davies, lost her seat (Porthcawl East) to an Independent candidate. The Conservatives retained only the Newton seat, losing five councillors.

|}

Five out of the fifty four seats were elected unopposed.

Ward results

References

Bridgend
2012